The Vicariate Apostolic of San José de Amazonas Latin Church apostolic vicariate of the Catholic Church located in the town of Indiana in Peru.

History
On 13 July 1945 Pope Pius XII established the Prefecture Apostolic of San José de Amazonas from the Vicariate Apostolic of San León del Amazonas.  The prefecture was elevated to a Vicariate Apostolic on 3 July 1955.

Bishops

Ordinaries
José Damase Laberge, O.F.M. † (4 Jan 1946 – 25 Dec 1968)
Lorenzo Rodolfo Guibord Lévesque, O.F.M. † (29 May 1969 – 17 Jan 1998)
Alberto Campos Hernández, O.F.M. (17 Jan 1998 – 8 Aug 2011)
José Javier Travieso Martín, C.M.F. (1 Nov 2014 - )

Auxiliary bishop
Lorenzo Rodolfo Guibord Lévesque, O.F.M. † (1967-1969), appointed Vicar Apostolic here

See also
Roman Catholicism in Peru

Sources

Apostolic vicariates
Roman Catholic dioceses in Peru
Christian organizations established in 1945
1945 establishments in Peru